Germanic names, inherited from the Suevi (who settled in Gallaecia: modern Galicia and northern Portugal in 409 AD), Visigoths, Vandals, Franks and other Germanic peoples, were often the most common Galician-Portuguese names during the early and high Middle Ages. This article deals with Germanic personal names recorded and used in Galicia, northern Portugal and its adjoining regions: territories of the kingdom of the Suebi during the early Middle Ages from its 409 settlement to the 12th century.

Germanic names 

Germanic names were the most common personal names in Galicia-Portugal during the early and high Middle Ages, surpassing Christian and Roman names in number and popularity. The names, primarily of East Germanic origin, were used by the Suebi, Goths, Vandals and Burgundians. With the names, the Galicians inherited the Germanic onomastic system; a person used one name (sometimes a nickname or alias), with no surname, occasionally adding a patronymic. More than 1,000 such names have been preserved in local records. and in local toponyms.

Many of the Germanic names were composite, with the second element usually a noun with the same gender of the bearer. Others were hypocorisms formed from a composite name or deriving from it. Less frequently, a name was a noun or an adjective.

These names were transmitted to the Suevi with the usual Germanic rules of inheritance, which were variations (passing one element of the name; Rechiar was the son of Rechila, who was the son of Hermeric) and alliteration (names beginning with the same sound; Maldras was the son of the nobleman Masila). Full names were later transmitted from grandfather to grandson (commemoration), following a trend common until the present in most of western Europe.

Adaptations 
In addition to the conversion of many Germanic endings into Romance or Latin endings, the names had phonetic adaptations such as the change of word stress from the first to the penultimate syllable, the conversion of most [þ] into [t] or [d] and the conversion of [h] into [k] before a consonant. [W] was initially preserved, although noted as [u] or [oy] before becoming [gw] (or, less commonly, [b]). These early inherited names underwent Western Romance and Galician changes from Latin, such as consonant lenition and palatalization. This contributed to a large number of variants in recorded names; Ostrofredus was recorded in Galicia-Portugal as Ortofredus, Ostofredo, Ostouredus, Ostrofedone, Stobredo and Strofredo.

Names used by the Suevi 
The following names, used by the Suevi of Gallaecia during the fifth and sixth centuries, were recorded in chronicles, inscriptions and acts of local ecclesiastical councils:
Hermericus, Heremigarius, Rechila, Rechiarius, Agriulfum, Maldras, Massila, Framta, Frumarius, Rechimundus, Remismundus, Veremundus, Chararici, Ariamirus, Ildericus, Theudomirus, Miro, Nitigisius, Uittimer, Anila, Remisol, Adoric, Eboricus, Siseguntia f, Audeca, Malaricus, Pantardus, Neufila, Hildemirus, Commundus, Ermaricus, Sunila, Becilla, Gardingus, Argiovitus, Gomedei, Rodomiro, Ermengontia f, Remisiwera f, Thuresmuda f, Suinthiliuba f.

Many of the names, used by kings such as Miro, Reckila and Theudemirus, were used for local toponyms: Mirón, Requián, Requiás, Requiás and Receá, Tuimil and Toimil.

Roots 

The following is a list of the roots used to form Germanic personal names in Galicia-Portugal and northwestern Iberia. Many are related to war, victory, fame, boldness, strength and warlike qualities (bald-, funs-, hild-, gund-, nand-, rod-, seg-, send-), totemic animals (ar-, wulf-, ber-, ebur-) and weapons (brand-, bruni-, rand-, saru-); many others refer to knowledge, love and other peaceful qualities (fred-, leob-, mun-, ragi-, rad-, uin-). Some refer to the condition of ruler or master (fro-, ric-, vald-, Froya, Theodinus, Tructinus, Hendinus). Another group refers to the tribe, nation or country (conia-, fulc-, teod-, leod-, man-, truct-, gavi-, gogi-, kend-), and another appears to refer to Huns (Hun-), Suevi (Sav-), Goths (Gut-), Vandals (Vandal-), Celts (Vala-), Vendians/Slavs (Venet-), Galindians/Balths (Galind-), Franks (Frank-), Saxons (Sax-), Angles (Engl-), Danes (Dan-) and other peoples. Although some elements are identical to others found in Celtic anthroponymy (And-, Dag-, -mar, -riks), others appear to be adaptations of Latin words and names incorporated in the Danube region: Florens, Fortis, Crescens.

Forms marked with an asterisk are unrecorded and hypothetical. PGmc is an abbreviation for Proto-Germanic.

{| class="wikitable"
! Name !! Proto-Germanic root !! Meaning !! Examples
|-
| ab- || *abōn || "man" || Abbelinus
|-
| abr- || *abraz || "huge, strong" || Abragasia, Abrecan, Abronilli
|-
|ad- (later a-) || *haþuz || "battle, fight" || Adefonsus, Adegundia, Adeqisio, Aderedus, Aderico, Adesindus, Adica, Adiero, Adarius, Adila, Adileobo, Adileova, Adimirus, Adolinus, Adosinda
|-
| adal- || *aþalaz || "noble" || Adala, Addalinus, Adegaster, Adelasindo, Atalamondo
|-
| agi-, egi- (later ei-) || *agez; or *agjō || "fear"; or "edge" || Agimadus, Agio, Agiulfus, Aidio, Egeredus, Egica, Egila, Agila, Egildus, Agildus, Egilo, Ailo, Eigonza, Eileuva, Eilleus, Eimirus, Eindu, Eirigu, Eisindus, Haginus
|-
| agr- ||perhaps *akraz || "field, open land" || Agrivulfum, Agromirus
|-
| aist- || *aistēn || "to give reverence" || Aistando
|-
| ala- || *ala  || "all, wholly" || Alaguntia, Alamiro, Alaricus, Alarius, Alatrudia, Alobrida, Aloindo, Aloitus, Alvarus
|-
| alb- || *albaz || "elf" || Albiaster, Alvaricus, Alvatus
|-
| ald- || *aldaz || "old" || Aldemirus, Aldereto, Aldericus, Aldia, Aldinus
|-
| aldr- || *aldran || "age, life" || Aldras, Aldroitus
|-
| ali-|| *aljaz || "other" || Alia, Alio, Aliaricus, Alifreda, Aliulfus, Aliverga, Alivergo, Aliverko, Aliverta, Alivertus, Alliefredus
|-
| am-, eim-, em-, en- || *haimaz || "dear" || Amingus, Eimoricus, Emila, Emilo, Emiso, Enaredus, Engildus, Entrudi
|-
| amal- || *amal- || "valiant, brave" || Amalilli
|-
| amed- || *amitaz || "continuous" || Amedon, Amedeiro
|-
|an- || *an- || "forefather" || Anagildus, Analsus, Anila, Anilo, Anualdus, Anulfo
|-
| and-, ant- || *anda || "throughout" || Andeatus, Andericus, Andiarius, Andifonso, Andila, Andilevo, Andilo, Anditio, Ando, Andosindus, Andulfus, Antemirus
|-
| ans- || *ansuz || "god" || Ansedeus, Ansemarus, Ansemirus, Ansemondus, Anseredo, Ansericus, Ansetrudia, Ansila, Ansileova, Ansilo, Ansiulphus, Ansiunda, Ansobrida, Ansoi, Anson, Ansuallo, Ansuario, Ansueto, Ansuildi, Ansvertus
|- 
|aquis- || *akwesiz || "axe" || Aquisilde
|-
| ar- || *arnōn or *arwaz || "eagle" or "swift, ready" || Aragunti, Arosinda, Arosindus, Arualdus, Aruildi, Arumundo
|-
| ard- || *harduz or *arduz|| "hard" or "land" || Ardabastus, Ardericus, Ardaldus, Ardesendus, Ardilo, Ardulfus, Artemiro, Erdebredo
|-
| ari-, argi- || *harjaz || "army" || Arebuldo, Argeberto, Argefonsus, Argemirus, Argemondo, Argenilli, Argeredus, Argericus, Argesindus, Argeva, Argevadus, Argevitus, Argifonsa, Argifredus, Argileuva, Argilo, Argioi, Argiuolus, Argivastro, Ariulfus
|-
| aria- || *arjaz || "noble" || Arias, Ariastre
|-
| arn- || *arnuz || "eagle" || Arnadius, Arnaldus, Arnulfo
|-
| asc- || *askaz || "ash-tree" || Ascarigus, Ascarius, Asculfo
|-
| ase- || *haswaz || "grey" || Asemondus, Asileva, Asinoy, Asiulfus, Asofuda, Asoi, Asoredus
|-
|  asp- || *aspōn || "aspen" || Asparigus
|-
|  ast- || *astaz;  or *austaz ||"branch"; or  "east" || Astaguerra, Asterigo, Astileuva, Astredo, Astualdu, Astulfus
|-
|  astr-, ostr-, obstr-, stor- || *austraz || "east" || Astragis, Astragundia, Astramondus, Astratus, Astremarus, Astriverga, Astrogoto, Astruara, Astruario, Astruedu, Astruildi, Astrulfus, Obstrisinda, Ostamalus, Ostosia, Ostrofreda, Ostrofredo, Ostromirus, Astromirus, Estromirus, Storesindo
|-
|  at- (later ad-) || *haþuz || "war" || Ataulfus, Atarius, Atericus, Aton
|-
|  atan-, tan- || *aþnaz || "year" || Atanagildus, Atanaricus, Atanus, Tanina, Tanino, Atanitus, Tano, Tanoi, Tenildi
|-
|  att- || *attōn  || "father" || Atauldus, Attan, Attila, Attina
|-
|  aud-, od- || *audaz ||   "wealth" ||  Audeca, Audesinda, Audila, Audinus, Audibertus, Audofredo, Audugus, Ausendus, Oda, Odemundus, Odamirus, Odericus, Odisclus, Odorica, Odoynus, Oduarius, Otualdo
|-
|  aur-, or- ||  *auraz || "sand, sea" || Auresindus, Aurilli, Orosinda
|-
|  aus-, os- || *aus- || "shining" || Osoarius, Osobredus, Osmundo, Osoredo, Osorico, Ausarigus, Osoy, Ossila, Ozandus
|-
|  bad- (later ba-) || *badwō || "battle" || Badamundus, Bademirus, Badila, Badosindus
|-
|  bait- || *baitaz || "ship, boat" || Baitus
|-
|  bald-, balt- || *balþaz || "bold" || Baldemarius, Baldemirus, Balderedo, Balderico, Baldesindo, Baldila, Baldoi, Baldoigius, Baltarius, Baltino, Balto
|-
|  bar- || *barô || "man" || Barilli, Barsilli, Baron, Baroncellus, Baronza, Barvaldus
|-
|  bat- ||  *bataz || "good" || Bati, Batinus, Baton
|-
|  baud- || *baudiz || "ruler" || Baudemirus, Baudesindus
|-
|  baz- || *bazaz || "naked" || Bazarius
|-
|  beg-, bag-, bec-, bac-  || *bēgaz || "contest, quarrel" || Baga, Bega, Becilla, Bagesindus, Becosindo, Bagina, Bagino, Baquina, Baquino, Begica, Pegito
|-
|  ber- || *berōn || "bear" || Bera, Bergundi, Berila, Berildi, Berosildi, Berilo, Berina, Berinus, Beroi, Berosindus, Berulfus
|-
|  berg-, verg- || *bergaz || "shelter" || Bergas, Bergila, Vergilli, Vergina, Virgia
|-
|  bern- || *bernuz || "bear" || Bernaldus
|-
|  bert-, vert- || *berhtaz || "bright" || Berta, Bertamirus, Bertarius, Bertinus, Berto, Bertosinda, Bertuara, Betrulfus, Bretenandus, Vertila
|-
|  bett-, bitt- || perhaps *bitraz || "bitter" || Betellus, Betericus, Bitilo, Bitto
|-
|  bid- || *bidō || "request, prayer" || Biddi, Bidualdus
|-
|  bil-, bel- || *bilaz or *bīþlan || "good" or "axe" || Bela, Belavrida, Belesarius, Belestrio, Belfonsus, Bellengo, Bellerto, Bello, Belloy, Belmirus, Billa
|-
|  bland- ||  *blandiz (likely an adjective derived from *blandaną) || "to blend, make murky; to mix, mingle" || Blandila
|-
|  bliv- || *blēwaz || "blue" || Bliviaricus
|-
|  bon- || *bōniz || "prayer, petition" || Bonesindus, Bonilde, Bonimiro, Boninus, Boniza, Bonoi
|-
|  bot-, but- || *bōtō || "good, profit" || Botan, Butila
|-
|  brand- || *brandaz || "fire, sword" || Brandericus, Brandila, Brandinus, Brandiulfus, Brandon
|-
|  brun- || *brunjōn || "breastplate" || Brunildi
|-
|  burgal- || *Bulgar- || "Bulgarian?" || Burgala
|-
|  ca- ||  *ga- || "with" || Camundus
|-
|  canut- ||  *knūtaz || "bold" || Canuto
|-
|  car-, kar- || *karō || "care" || Karmirus
|-
|  carl- || *karlaz || "man" || Carlo
|-
|  cart-, kart- || *krattaz || "cart, wagon" ||  Cartinus, Cartemirus
|-
|  cen- || *kwenōn || "woman" || Cenabrida, Cenusenda
|-
|  cend-, kend-, zend-, quint- || *kenþan || "child" || Cendamiro, Cendas, Cendon, Kenderedus, Kendulfus, Kindiverga, Quintila, Quintilo, Zendasindo
|-
|  cens-, zens- ||  perhaps *zinz or *kwēniz || "tribute" or "woman" || Censerigus, Censoi, Zenzitus
|-
|  conia- || *kunjan || "tribe, nation" || Coniaricus
|-
|  cresc- || perhaps Latin crescens || "thrive" || Crescemirus
|-
|  criz- || *krēsō || "dainty, food" || Crizila
|-
|  dad-, ded- || *dēdiz || "deed" || Dada, Dadila, Dadilo, Dadinus, Dado, Dede
|-
|  dag-, dac- || *dagaz || "day" || Dacamiro, Dacoi, Dagadrudia, Dacaredus, Dago, Daildus
|-
|  dan-, da- || *daniz || "Dane" || Damiro, Damondus, Danila
|-
|  dest-, test- || perhaps Latin dexter || "right, skilful" || Destoy, Destericus, Desteilli
|-
|  doc-, duc- || *dōgiz || "day" || Docemiro, Ducila
|-
|  dod- || no clear etymology; perhaps related to *dēdiz || "deed" || Dodo, Doda
|-
|  dom- ||*dōmaz || "judgement, ruling" || Domerigo
|-
|  dulc-, dolc- || *dulgan or *dulgaz || "enmity" or "law, debt" || Dulcemirus, Dolcemondus
|-
|  ebr-, ebur-, evor-  || *eburaz || "boar" || Ebragundia, Ebreguldus, Ebregulfus, Ebrildi, Eburicus, Evorinus
|-
|  elp- || *helpō || "help" || Elperico
|-
|  elpand- || *elpandus || "elephant" || Elpandus
|-
|  engl- || *angilaz || "Angles" || Engladius
|-
|  engo- || *Ingwaz || "a god" || Engomirus, Engoredus, Engorigus
|-
|  ens- || perhaps Latin ensis || "sword" || Ensalde, Iensericus
|-
|  er-, her- || *heruz || "sword" || Erifonsus, Eroigius, Eruulfus, Herus
|-
|  erm-, herm- || *ermenaz || "great" || Ermaldus, Ermedrudia, Ermefara, Ermefreda, Ermefredo, Ermegildus, Ermegis, Ermego, Ermegoto, Ermegotus, Ermegundia, Ermelindus, Ermemirus, Ermericus, Ermerote, Ermesinda, Ermiarius, Ermila, Ermildi, Ermileuva, Ermitus, Ermoleo, Ermosindus, Ermoygius, Ermulfo, Heremigarium, Hermecisclus, Hermellus
|-
|  evo- || *ehwaz || "horse" || Euvenandus, Eva, Evorido, Evosindo, Ivolicus, Ibilli
|-
|  faf- || *faff- (perhaps related to Indo-European *papp-) || "dad" || Faffila, Faffia 
|-
|  fag- || *fagenaz || "glad, joyful" || Fagila, Fagildus, Fagilo, Faginus
|-
|  fald- ||  *faldiz || "fold, cloak" || Falderedo, Falgildus, Fardulfus
|-
|  fand- || *fanþjōn || "infantryman" || Fandila, Fandina, Fandinus, Fannus
|-
|  faq-, fak- ||  *fah- || "glad, joyful" || Facalo, Facco, Fakino, Faquilo
|-
|  far- || *faran || "journey, ship" || Faregia, Farella, Farino, Farita, Farnus, Framiro, Fraredus, Frarigo, Fregulfus, Ferildi
|-
|  fat-' || *fatan || "cloth; vessel" || Fatu, Fateredus|-
|  fel-, fil- ||  *felu || "much, very" || Felellus, Felgirus, Felmiro, Filisteus, Filivertus, Filon|-
|  flor- || *flōraz or Latin florens || "floor" or "blooming, prosperous" || Floresindus|-
|  fof- || perhaps *fōþrą  || "load, wagonload" || Fofo, Fofinus, Fofellus|-
|  fons-, funs- || *funsaz || "eager, ready" || Fonso, Fonsa, Fonsinus, Fonsellus|-
|  fradi- ||  *fraþīn || "efficacy" || Fradegundia, Fradila, Fradiulfus|-
|  fram- || *framaz || "forward; valiant" || Framila, Framilli, Framtan, Framuldo|-
|  frank-, franc- ||  *frankōn || "javelin; Frank" || Francellus, Francemirus, Franco, Francoi, Francolino, Frankila, Frankilo|-
|  fred-, frid- || *friþuz or *frīdaz || "peace" or "fair, beautiful" || Freda, Fredamundus, Fredario, Fredegundia, Fredemiro, Fredenanda, Fredenandus, Fredericus, Fredesinda, Fredilli, Fredisclus, Fredoaldus, Fredoindus, Fredosindus, Freduarius, Fredulfus, Fredus, Fridiverto|-
|  froa-, frau-, frog-, froy-, fron- ||  *frawjōn || "lord, master" || Froarengus, Fralenko, Frogeva, Frogildi, Frogina, Frogiulfo, Froiellus, Froila, Froilo, Froiloba, Froisenda, Froisendus, Fronildi, Fronosili, Fronuldo, Froya, Froyo, Froyslo, Fruaricus, Frugildus, Fruginus, Frauino, Frumirus, Frunilo|-
|  frum-, from- || *frumōn and *frumistaz || "foremost, first" and "first" || Fromista, Fremosilli, Fromaldus, Fromaricus, Fromildus, Fromosinda, Fromosindus, Fruma, Frumarius, Frumellus, Frumildi|-
|  fulc- || *fulkan || "crow, army" || Fulcaredus|-
|  gad-, gat- || *gadōn || "comrade" || Gademiro, Gadenanda, Gaton|-
|  gael-, gel- ||  *gailaz || "merry" || Gaella, Gelmiro, Geloira|-
|  gaf-, gef-, geb- || *gebō || "gift" ||Gaffo, Gebuldus, Gefera|-
|  gaid- ||  *gaidō || "spearhead, arrowhead" || Gaidus|-
|  gaif- || *waibjanan || "to surround" || Gaifar|-
|  galind-, kalend- ||  *galind- || "Galindian" (a Baltic people) || Galindus, Kalendus|-
|  gan- || perhaps gan || "enchantment" || Ganati, Ganilli, Ganiti, Ganoi|-
|  gand- ||  *gandaz || "wand, staff" || Gandila, Gandinus, Gandulfo, Gandus|-
|  gard- || *gardaz || "house, enclosure" || Gardingus, Gardulfus|-
|  gas-, ges-, gis-, ger-, gir- || *gaizaz || "spear" || Gasuildi, Gera, Gesa, Gero, Geserigus, Gesmira, Germira, Gesmiro, Gesulfus, Ierulfus, Giraldus, Gismundus, Germundus, Gisovredus, Gisvado|-
|  gast- || *gastiz || "guest" || Gastre|-
|  gaud-, caud- || no clear etymology; perhaps *gaut- or Latin gaudeo || "Goth" or "rejoice" || Caudemirus, Gauderigus,  Gaudesindo, Gaudilani, Gaudilli, Gaudinas|-
|  gav-, gau-, gogi-, cogi-, gagi-, cagi-, kegi-, || *gaujan || "district" || Cagildo, Cagita, Cagitus, Gagica, Gaufredus, Gaulfus, Gavila, Gavina, Gavinus, Gega, Gegitus, Gigelus, Gogia, Gogilli, Gogina, Gogitus, Gogius, Goymundus, Guimundus, Guginus, Gugivertus, Guimirus, Guiricus, Guisenda, Goysenda, Guisindus, Kagilda, Keila|-
|  geld-, gild-, kelt- || *geldan || "tribute, recompense" || Geldemirus, Gildaricus, Gildo, Keltoi|-
|  gen-, ian-, ion- || *gennan || "beginning" || Genildi, Ionilde, Genlo, Genobreda, Gemundus, Ianardo, Ionarico|-
|  gend- || perhaps *gantijaną || "To make whole; make complete" || Gendo, Gendina|-
|  get-, git- ||  || "glory" || Geda, Getericus, Getilli, Getina, Getoy, Gidiberto, Gitarius, Gitesindus, Gitio|-
|  gisl-, viscl-, cisl- || *gīslaz || "hostage" || Cisla, Viclavara, Viscaverga, Visclafredo, Visclamirus, Visclamundus, Visclario|-
|  givel- || *geb(e)lōn || "skull, gable" ||Givellan|-
|  glad- || *gladaz || "bright, glad" || Gladila|-
|  god-, gud- (later go-, gu-) ||  *gōdaz || "good" || Godefredus, Godegildus, Godella, Godellus, Godemiro, Godenanda, Godesinda, Godoigia, Godomundus, Gudenandus, Guderedus, Guderigo, Gudesindus, Gudesteus, Gudigeba, Gudila, Gudileuva, Gudilo, Gudilulfo,Gudiverga|-
|  gol- || *gōljanan or *gōlaz || "to greet" or "pride" || Golinus, Gollo|-
|  gom-, gum- ||  *gumōn || "man" ||Gomadus, Gomaldo, Gomaredus, Gomarigus, Gomesindo, Gomita, Gomulfus, Gomundus, Guma, Gumarius, Gumellus, Gumila, Gumito|-
|  gram- || *gramaz || "furious" || Gramila|-
|  gran-|| *grannaz or *granō || "slim, slender" or "moustache" || Granilo|-
|  grim- || *grīmōn || "mask, helmet" || Grima, Grimaldus|-
|  gris- || *grīsanan or *grīsaz || "to dread" or "grey" || Grisulfus, Gresomarus|-
|  guald- || *waldaz || "powerful, mighty" || Gualdarius, Gualdeo|-
|  guandal- || *wandilaz  || "Vandal" || Guandalisco, Guandalar|-
|  guld- || *wulþuz || "splendour" || Goldegildo, Goldredo, Guldarius, Gulderigus|-
|  guldr-, goltr- || *wulþraz || "wonderful, precious" || Goldregodo, Gulderes, Gualdramirus|-
|  gulf-, golf- || *wulfaz || "wolf" || Golfarico, Gulfarius, Gulfemirus|-
|  gund-, gunt-, gunz-, cunt-, gond- || *gunthz || "fight" || Gonceria, Gondella, Gondenanda, Gonso, Gonta, Gontemondus, Gontere, Gonderes, Gontoi, Gontualdo, Gonza, Guncitus, Gundarius, Gundebredo, Gundebrida, Gundelinus, Gundemarus, Gunderamnus, Gunderedo, Gunderigus, Gunderona, Gundertia, Gundesindus, Gundifortis, Gundigeva, Gundila, Gundilo, Gundisalva, Gundisalvus, Gundiscalcus, Gundivadus, Gundivaldo, Gundivera, Gundiverga, Gundon, Gundulfo, Guntato, Guntedrudia, Guntellus, Guntemirus, Gunterotis, Gunti, Guntiesclo, Guntigio, Guntilli, Gundesilli, Guntina, Guntinus, Guntuigia|-
|  gut- (later god-) || *gutōn || "Goth" || Gotesendus, Goto, Gota, Goton, Gudegisus, Gutellus, Gutemirus, Gutemondo, Gutilli, Gutilo, Gutina, Gutinus, Guto, Guta, Gutumarus|-
|  hend-, ind-, hand- || probably related to Burgundian hendinus || "king" || Endulfus, Hamdino, Indisclus|-
|  hild-, ild-, eld-, ald- || *heldjō || "battle" || Alderedus, Alduarius, Eldan, Eldebona, Eldegeses, Eldegotus, Eldegundia, Eldemirus, Eldemundus, Eldesinda, Eldesindus, Eldigia, Eldinus, Eldivercus, Eldivertus, Eldo, Eldoigius, Elleca, Ildebredus, Ildefonsus, Ilderigus, Ildiverga, Ildoi, Ildoncia, Ildras, Ilduara, Ildulfus|-
|  ik-, eq-, ig- || perhaps *eka || "I" || Igo, Ika, Ikila|-
|  it-, id- || (no clear etymology) || || Idiverto, Itila, Itilo, Itimondo, Itaultus|-
|  iuv-, iub- || no clear etymology; perhaps Latin iuvenis "young" or metathesis of *webaną "to weave" (cf. *wesuz → ius-, *westan → iust-) || "young" or "weave" || Iovellinus, Iubarius, Iubinus, Iuuisclus, Iuvatus, Iuvericus, Iuvila, Iuvitus|-
|  ket-, qued-, quid- || to PGmc *kweþanan || "to say" || Kedisilo, Ketemera, Ketenando, Keti, Ketoi, Quedesendo, Quedulfus, Quidemirus, Quidericus, Quitarius, Quitoi|-
|  lal-, lel-, lil- || probably Latin lallus || "lullaby" || Lalla, Lalli, Lallina, Lallinus, Lallus, Lelino, Leliola, Lilliola, Lelli, Lilla, Lilli, Lillo, Lilla|-
|  leo- || *hlewaz || "glory, renown" || Leomirus|-
|  leode-, leude- || *leudiz || "man, people" || Ledla, Leodarius, Leodefredus, Leodegasti, Leodegisius, Leodegundia, Leodemiro, Leodemundo, Leoderigus, Leodesindo, Leodeuigus, Leodo, Leodulfus|-
|  leov-, leub- || *leubaz || "beloved" || Leovaldo, Leovegildus, Leovegoto, Leoveredus, Leoverigus, Leoverona, Leoverto, Leovesenda, Leovesindus, Leovilli, Leovus, Leuba, Leubegutus, Liuvilo, Lovoi, Lubellus, Lubila, Lubinus|-
|  lot- || *hludaz || "famous" || Lotarius|-
|  mact- (later meit-) || *mahtiz || "power, might" || Meitinus, Matericus, Mectubrida, Meitilli, Meitulfus|-
|  mag- || *magenan || "might, power" || Magan, Magila, Magitus, Maniaricus, Maniarius, Magnitus, Maniulfus, Megildus|-
|  mal- || unclear etymology, perhaps related to *malanan || "to grind" || Malaricus, Malaredus|-
|  malasc- || perhaps *malskaz || "proud" || Malasco|-
|  maldr- || perhaps *maldriz || "flour" || Maldras|-
|  man- (later ma-) || *manan || "fellow" || Manildi, Manusildi, Manileuva, Manilla, Maninus, Manosenda, Manosindus, Manualdus, Manulfus, Menegundia|-
|  mand-, mant- || *manþaz || "kind" || Mandila, Mandinus, Mandulfo, Mantellus|-
|  mann- (later man-) || *mannz || "man" ||Manitus, Manna, Mannello, Manni, Manno, Manoim, Mansuara|-
|  marc- || *markō or *marhaz || "region, border" or "horse" || Marco, Marcosendus, Marcitus|-
|  mart- || perhaps *marþuz || "marten" || Martila|-
|  matl-, matr- || *maþlan || "assembly" || Matrosindus, Matrinus, Matroi|-
|  maur- (later mour-) || perhaps *mauraz or Latin maurus || "ant" or "Moor" || Mauran, Maurentan, Maurican, Mauron|-
|  medum- (later meom-) || *medumaz || "middling, moderate" || Meduma|-
|  mer-, mir-, mar- || *mērjaz || "famous" || Margilli, Merila, Meroildi, Mervigius, Mira, Mirella, Mirellus, Miro, Mirosinda, Mirualdo|-
|  mod-, mud- || *mōdaz || "anger, wrath" || Modericus, Moderido, Modildus, Modilli, Mudario, Mudila|-
|  mun-, mon- || *muniz || "thought" || Monefonsus, Monobredo, Munisclus|-
|  mund-, mond- || *mundō || "protection" || Monderico, Mondoi, Mundellus, Mundila, Mundildus, Mundinus, Mundus|-
|  nand-, nant-|| *nanþaz || "bold, courageous" || Nandamundus, Nandaricus, Nandinus, Nandoi, Nandulfo, Nandus, Nantemiro, Nantildo|-
|  naust- || *naustą || "a ship-shed, boathouse" || Naustus, Naustila|-
|  neu-, nu- || *neujaz || "new" || Nuilla, Nuillo, Neufila|-
|  nit- || *nīþaz or *niþjaz || "hatred" or "kinsman" || Nitigisius|-
|  not- || *nauthiz || "need" || Notarius|-
|  of- || *ubjōn || "abundance" ||Offa, Ofila, Offilo|-
|  old- || *hulþaz || "kind, clement"|| Olda, Oldaricus|-
|  opp- || perhaps *ōbjanan (related to Latin opus "work") || "to celebrate solemnly" || Oppa, Oppila|-
|  osd- || *huzdan || "treasure" || Osdulfus|-
|  pant- || *pandan or *banti || "pledge" or "district" || Pantardus, Panto, Pantinus|-
|  pap-, pep- || no clear etymology; perhaps *pipo or Latin pāpiliō || "pipe or flute (wind instrument)" or "butterfly, moth" || Papellus, Papitus, Pappinus, Pappo, Pepi, Pipericus, Pipinus|-
|  penn-, pen- || perhaps Latin penna || "feather" || Penetrudia, Penus, Pennino|-
|  rad-, rat- || *rēdaz || "advice" || Rademirus, Rademundus, Radesindus, Radulfus, Ratario, Retericus|-
|  ragi-, ragn- (later rei-) || *raginą || "advice, decision" || Ragesenda, Ragesindus, Ragian, Ragifredo, Ragimiru, Ragito, Ragolfus, Raiola, Raiolo, Reginaldus, Reimondus, Reirigus|-
|  rak- || *rakan or *wrakaz || "reason, talk" or "pursuer" || Rakericus|-
|  ram- || *rammaz || "strong; ram" || Ramila, Ramon, Ramulo|-
|  rana-, rani- (later ra-) || probably *rannjanan || "to run" || Ranarius, Ranemira, Ranemirus, Ranemundus, Ranilo, Ranisclus, Raniverga, Raniverta, Ranivertus, Ranosenda, Ranosindus, Ranualdus, Ranulfus|-
|  rand-, rant- || *randaz || "shield" || Randemirus, Randili, Randinus, Rando, Randuarius, Randulfus, Rendericus|-
|  raup-|| *raupjanan || "to plunder, to spoil" || Rauparius|-
|  rec-, req-, ric- || *rīkjaz || "mighty, noble" || Recaredus, Reccafredus, Recebrida, Recedrudia, Recelli, Recemera, Recemirus, Recemundus, Recesenda, Recesindus, Recesuinda, Recesuindus, Rechiarius, Recilli, Requilli, Recinus, Recualdus, Regaulfus, Reicionda, Rekeritus, Requefonsus, Rezevera, Ricardo, Riquila, Riquilo, Riquilodo, Riquoi|-
|  ref- || *hrabnaz || "crow" || Refulfo|-
|  rem- || *remez || "rest, calmness" || Remegildus, Remesario, Remesilli, Remesindus, Remestro, Remismundus, Remisol, Rimionda|-
|  rest- || *ristiz || "rising up" || Restericus|-
|  rod-, rud- || *hrōþaz || "fame" || Rodemirus, Rodevertus, Rodosildi, Rodougus, Roelindus, Rouvredo, Rudericus, Rudesindus, Rudila, Rudilo|-
|  rom-, rum- || *hrōmaz || "fame" || Romarigus, Romila, Rumario|-
|  sala- (later sa-) || *salaz || 'hall, dwelling' || Salamirus, Salamarus, Salla|-
|  sand-, sant- || *sanþaz || "truth, justice" || Sandinus, Sando, Santimirus|-
|  sar- || *sarwan || "arm, armament" || Saroi, Saruilli|-
|  sax- (later seix-) || *sahsan and *sahxōn || "knife" and "Saxon" || Saxo, Seixomir|-
|  scap- || *skapan || "vessel" || Scapa|-
|  scarc-||  *skalkaz || "servant; sword" || Scarcila|-
|  scer- || *skīriz || "pure" || Scerinus|-
|  sed- || *seduz || "custom" ||Sedino|-
|  sedeg- || *sedīgaz || "well-bred, well-behaved" || Sedeges|-
|  seg-, sag-, sig- (later se-, si-) || *segez || "victory" || Sagatus, Sagildo, Sagulfus, Segemundus, Segesindo, Segestro, Segga, Segika, Segimarus, Segioi, Segomirus, Seguinus, Sigeberto, Sigefrida, Sigeredus, Sigericus, Sigesgundia, Sigesinda, Sigila, Sigu, Segio|-
|  sel- || *sēliz || "good, kind" || Selmirus, Seloi|-
|  selv- || *selbaz || "self" || Selvas, Selvatus|-
|  sen-, sin- ||  *senaz || "ever, old" || Senatrudia, Seniberta, Senildi, Senuita, Senuldo, Sinerta, Sinifredus|-
|  send-, sent- || *senþaz or *swenþaz || "companion" or "strong" ||Senda, Sendamirus, Sendello, Sendericus, Senderiga, Sendina, Sendinus, Sendoi, Sendon, Sendredus, Senduitu, Sendulfus, Senta, Sentarius, Sindamundus, Sindi, Sindigis, Sindila, Sindileuba, Sindilo, Sindiverga, Sindo, Sinduara|-
|  ser- || *swēraz || "valued, honoured" || Seririgo, Serulfus, Servaldus|-
|  sigunt- || *sebunþōn || "seventh" || Sigunterigo|-
|  sis-, ses- || perhaps related to Old High German sisu || "funerary song, ritual" || Sescutus, Sesericus, Sesina, Sesmiro, Sesmundo, Sesoi, Sesuito, Sisa, Sisebutus, Sisegundia, Sisellus, Sisildus, Sisileova, Sisilli, Sisilu, Sisinus, Sisiverta, Sisiverto, Sisivigia, Sisnandus, Sisualdo, Sisuita, Sisuldus, Sisulfus, Zisila|-
|  sit- || *setan || "seat" ||Sitagellus, Siti, Sitividis|-
|  smer- || *smerwōn || "fat" || Smerlo|-
|  sontr-, suntr- || *sunþrjaz || "southern" || Sontrilli, Suntria|-
|  span- || *spananan || "to lead" || Spanaricu, Spanarius, Spanilo, Spanosendo, Spanubrida|-
|  spand- || perhaps *spannanan || "to join" || Spandaricus|-
|  spar- || *sparwaz || "sparrow" || Espallo, Sparuildi|-
|  speraut- || *spreutanan || "to sprout" || Sperautan|-
|  spint- || *spenþa || "fat" || Spintilo, Spintino|-
|  spod- (later espo-) || perhaps *spōdiz || "prosperity, success" || Spodemiro, Spoderigo|-
|  stan- || *stainaz || "stone" || Stanildi|-
|  stod- || perhaps *stōdą || "a herd of horses" || Stodildi|-
|  strouc- || *streukanan || "to stroke" || Strouco|-
|  suab-, sab-, sav-, sev- || *swēbaz || "Suebian" || Sabaredus, Sabegoto, Sabila, Sabita, Sabitus, Savaracus, Savaricus, Savegodus, Savildi, Savoy, Sevegildo, Suabas, Suavar|-
|  sue- || *swe- || "own" || Sueredus, Suimirus|-
|  sund-, sunt- || *sunþiz || "south" || Sundemirus, Suntarius|-
|  suni-, seni-, sani-, soni- || *sunjō || "truth" || Sanigia, Seniaredus, Seniulfus, Sonegildus, Songimera, Soniaricus, Sonifreda, Sonita, Suniagisclus, Suniarius, Suniemirus, Sunila, Sunildi, Sunilo, Sunitus|-
|  sunn- || *sunnan || "sun" || Sonna|-
|  tanc- || *þankaz || "favor, grace" || Tancila, Tancinus, Tancus, Tanquilli|-
|  tanth- || *tanþz || "tooth" || Tandus|-
|  tat-, zaz- || *taitaz || "radiant; bright" || Tata, Tatina, Zazitus, Zazo|-
|  teg- || *þegnaz || "thane, freeman" || Tegila, Tegino, Tegio, Tegitus|-
|  teq- || perhaps *tēkaną or *tehwō by alteration of H to K || "to touch, to grasp" or "order, array" || Tequilo, Texilli|-
|  teud-, teod-, tod-, ted- (later teo-) || *þeudō and *þeudanaz || "nation" and "king" || Teadario, Tederona, Tedoy, Teobaldus, Teoda, Teodefredo, Teodegildo, Teodegondia, Teodemirus, Teodemundus, Teodenandus, Teoderados, Teoderago, Teoderedus, Teodericus, Teodesinda, Teodesindus, Teodeverga, Teodiberta, Teodila, Teodildi, Teodilo, Teodinus, Teodisclus, Teodiu, Teodoriga, Teodulfus, Teton, Teudecutus, Teudisila, Theodivertus, Tiotevadus, Todegia, Todegogia, Toduldo, Tota, Tudiscaisum|-
|  tit-, tet- || *taitōn || "little boy" || Tetina, Titila|-
|  tors-, turis- || *þursaz || "giant" || Torsario, Turisulfus|-
|  trad- || *þrēdaz || "quick" || Tradus, Tradinus|-
|  tras- || *þrasō || "move, fight" || Tracinus, Trasaricus, Trasarius, Trasavara, Trasendus, Trasido, Trasilli, Trasiuadus, Trasmira, Trasmiro, Trasmondo, Trasoi, Trassemutus, Trasuarius, Trasuinda, Trasulfus|-
|  trast- || *traustaz || "strong" || Trastalo, Trastelus, Trastemiro, Trastidia, Trastina, Trastulfus, Trastivigia|-
|  trevu- || *trewwaz || "faithful" || Trevuleus|-
|  truct- (later troit-) ||  *druhtiz, later *druhtīnaz|| "people, army" and "lord, master" || Tructinus, Tructa, Tructemiro, Tructemondo, Tructericus, Tructesinda, Tructesindus, Tructilli, Tructus, Truitellus, Truitero|-
|  trud- || *drūdaz || "friend, beloved" || Truda, Trudigildus, Trudildi, Trudilo, Trudina, Trudinus, Trudulfus|-
|  tund-, tunt- || *tunþuz || "tooth" || Tumtuldo, Tundulfus, Tuntila|-
|  un-, on- || *hūnaz || "cub" and "Hun" || Uniscus, Unisco, Onaredus, Onegilda, Onegildo, Onemirus, Onesindus, Onildi, Unilli, Onoricus, Onosinda, Unemundus, Unileus, Unilla|-
|  vad-, guad- (later gua-, ga-) || *wadaz || "ford" || Guadla, Uaduuara, Vadamundus, Vademirus|-
|  vala-, guala-, quala- || *walaz; or *walhaz || "the slain, battlefield"; or  "Celt" || Gualamarius, Gualamira, Gualamirus, Qualatrudia, Qualavara, Valarius|-
|  vamb- || *wambō || "belly" || Vamba|-
|  vand-, guand- || *wanduz || "wand, rod" || Guanadildi, Guandila, Guandilo, Guantaldus, Vandino, Vuanda|-
|  ven-, guin- || *weniz || "friend" || Guina, Guinilli, Uenildi, Guinus|-
|  venet-, guend-, vened-, genit- || *wenedaz || "Vendian, Slav" || Genitigia, Guendo, Venedario, Venetricus|-
|  ver- || *wērō || "pledge; true" || Vera, Vermundus, Veremudus|-
|  via- || perhaps *wīhan || "temple" || Viaricus, Viamundus|-
|  vidr-, vedr-, quitr- ||  *wiþra || "against" || Quitre, Vederoi, Vedragese, Vedrailli, Vidragildus, Vidraldus, Vidramirus|-
|  vidub- ||  *widuwaz || "widowed" || Vidubas|-
|  vig-, veg- || *wīgaz || "fighter" || Uegitus, Vigila, Vigilli, Vigilo, Vigiltu, Vigoy|-
|  vil-, guil-, quil- || *weljōn || "will" || Guiliberto, Quella, Uiliaredus, Uilloi, Gilloi, Vilesinda, Viliamirus, Vilian, Viliaricu, Viliarius, Viliatus, Viliefredus, Vilifonsus, Viligus, Vilitro, Viliulfus, Vilivado, Villavaria, Villelmus, Villisendo, Villo|-
| vim-  || *wīgą || "fight, battle" || Guimarigus, Uimaredus, Viman, Vimara|-
| vinc- || *wenkjanan || "to move sideways, to avoid" || Venze, Vincila|-
| vis-, ius- || *wesuz || "good" || Iusuandus, Uisulfus, Usegildus, Visaldus, Visaridus, Visellu|-
| visand- || *wisundaz || "bison" || Visandus|-
| vist-, iust- || *westan || "west" || Iusterigo, Iustiarius, Iustila, Vistemundo, Vistesinda, Iustesenda, Vistiberga, Vistisclo, Vistivara, Wistiz|-
| vistr-, iustr- || *westraz || "westward" || Iustri, Uistrello, Uistrileuba, Vestregoti, Visterla, Visterlo, Vistragildus, Vistramundi, Vistraricus, Vistrarius, Vistravara, Vistravarius, Vistregia, Vistremiro, Vistresindus, Vistrevius, Vistrildi, Vistresilli, Vistroi|-
| vit- (later vid-) || *witan || "knowledge" || Uita, Vidila, Vitinus, Vitisclus|-
| vitt-, vict (later vit-) || *witjan || "comprehension" || Uiti, Uittina, Victemirus, Victericus, Vitarius, Vitas, Vitila, Vitildus, Vitiza, Vittimero|-
| viv, oyv- || *wīban || "wife, woman" || Oyeuio, Vivildus|-
| viz-, quiz- || unclear etymology, the alteration of v to qu suggests that the original word started with an hw- cluster, perhaps *hwis || "to hiss, to rush, make a rushing sound" || Quizino, Viza, Vizamundus, Vizila, Vizoi|}

 Feminine roots 
Elements common as the second syllable of feminine names include:

Suffixes used to derive hypocoristic feminine names include:  
 -alo: Facalo, Trastalo
 -ilo (later -io): Acilo, Andilo, Anilo, Ansilo, Ardilo, Argilo, Berilo, Bitilo, Cisilo, Dadilo, Egilo, Ailo, Emilo, Esmerlo, Espallo, Fagilo, Faquilo, Frankilo, Froilo, Frunilo, Genilo, Genlo, Geodilo, Gracilo, Granilo, Guandilo, Gudilo, Gundilo, Gutilo, Itilo, Liuvilo, Nisilo, Nuillo, Nunnilo, Quintilo, Ranilo, Riquilo, Rudilo, Sindilo, Sisilu, Spanilo, Spintilo, Sunilo, Tafila, Teodilo, Tequilo, Trudilo, Vigilo, Visterlo
 -ina: Bagina, Baquina, Berina, Fandina, Frogina, Gavina, Gendina, Getina, Gogina, Guntina, Gutina, Lallina, Nunnina, Sendina, Sesina, Tanina, Tidina, Tetina, Trastina, Trudina, Vergina, Zanina
 -ita (later -ida): Acita, Cagita, Farita, Gomita, Nunnita, Sabita, Sonita
 -ella: Farella, Gondella, Mirella, Nunella

 Masculine roots 
Elements common as the second syllable of masculine names include:

Suffixes used to derive hypocoristic masculine names are:
 -eca, -ica (later -ega): Abrecan, Adica, Audeca, Begica, Egica, Elleca, Gagica, Segika
 -ila (later -ia): Adila, Andila, Anila, Ansila, Attila, Audila, Azilane, Badila, Baldila, Becilla, Bergila, Berila, Blandila, Brandila, Butila, Cixila, Crizila, Cutella, Dadila, Danila, Ducila, Egila, Agila, Emila, Ermila, Fafila, Fafia, Fagila, Fandila, Favila, Fradila, Framila, Frankila, Froila, Gandila, Gaudilani, Gavila, Gladila, Gramila, Guadla, Guandila, Gudila, Gulfila, Gumila, Gundila, Ikila, Itila, Iudila, Iustila, Iuvila, Keila, Kinquila, Ledla, Lubila, Magila, Manilla, Mantila, Martila, Massila, Mellilla, Merila, Mudila, Mugila, Mumila, Mundila, Naustila, Nuilla, Neufila, Nunnila, Ofila, Oila, Opila, Ossila, Quintila, Ramila, Riquila, Romila, Rudila, Sabila, Scarcila, Sigila, Sindila, Sunila, Tancila, Tegila, Teodila, Titila, Tuntila, Unilla, Vertila, Vidila, Vigila, Vincila, Visterla, Vitila, Vizila, Zisila
 -inus (later -ino): Addalinus, Aldinus, Bagino, Baltino, Baquino, Batinus, Berinus, Bertinus, Blandinus, Boninus, Brandinus, Cartinus, Crescino, Dadinus, Dalinus, Eldinus, Evorinus, Fandinus, Farino, Favino, Fofino, Fonsinus, Fruginus, Frauino, Gandinus, Gaudinas, Gavinus, Gentino, Gendinus, Golinus, Guginus, Gulfinus, Gultinus, Guntinus, Gutinus, Haginus, Hamdino, Iubinus, Karinus, Lallinus, Lelino, Lubinus, Mandinus, Maninus, Matlinus, Muginus, Mundinus, Nandinus, Naninus, Nunninus, Odinus, Audinus, Pantinus, Pappinus, Pennino, Pipinus, Quizino, Randinus, Recinus, Sandinus, Scerinus, Sedino, Sendinus, Sisinus, Spintino, Suffini, Tancinus, Tanino, Tatina, Tetina, Tegino, Teodinus, Tracinus, Tradinus, Tructinus, Trudinus, Uittina, Uittinus, Vandino, Goandinus, Vitinus, Zanino
 -linus, -llinus: Abbelino, Adolinus, Francolino, Gundelinus, Iovellinus
 -itus (later -ido): Cagitus, Carito, Crescitu, Donnitus, Froritum, Ganiti, Gegitus, Gogitus, Gumito, Guncitus, Iuvitus, Magitus, Magnitus, Manitus, Marcitus, Maxitus, Nannitus, Nonnitu, Papitus, Pegito, Pinnitus, Ragito, Sabitus, Sunitus, Sonnito, Tanitus, Atanitus, Tegitus, Trasido, Uegitus, Zanitus, Zazitus, Zenzitus 
 -ellus (later -elo): Betellus, Felellus, Francellus, Froiellus, Frumellus, Gigelus, Gumellus, Guntellus, Gutellus, Hermellus, Lubellus, Mannello, Mantellus, Mirellus, Mundellus, Nonellus, Papellus, Recelli, Sendello, Sisellus, Trastelus, Truitellus, Uistrello, Visellu, Zanellus

Superlative and comparative suffixes were also used in forming personal names:-iza: Boniza, Wittiza-istaz: Ariastre, Belestrio, Fromesta, Remestro, Segestro

Other suffixes imply origin or relationship:
 -ingaz: Amingus, Bellengus, Gardingus
 -iskaz: Vandaliscus "Vandal" (male), Huniscus "Hun" (male)
 -iskō: Hunisco "Hun" (female)

 Toponyms 
Many of these names are also toponyms (towns, parishes, villages, hamlets and fields), usually in the form of a Latin or Germanic genitive of the owner's name and sometimes preceded by the type of property (a Galician word of Latin, Germanic or pre-Latin origin) such as vila (villa, palace, estate), vilar (hamlet) castro (castle), casa (house), porta (pass, ford), agro (field), sa (Germanic sala; hall, house), busto (dairy), cabana (cabin), lama (pastures), fonte (well, spring), pena (fort), pumar (orchard) and val (valley). About five percent of Galicia's 315 municipalities  have this kind of name:
 Allariz to Aliarici, genitive of Aliaricus
 Baltar to Baltarii, genitive of Baltharius
 Beariz to Viarici, genitive of Viaricus
 Calvos de Randín to Randini, genitive of Randinus
 Forcarei to Fulcaredi, genitive of Fulkaredus
 Friol to Fredoaldi, genitive of Fredoaldus
 Gomesende to Gumesindi, genitive of Gumesindus
 Gondomar to Gundemari, genitive of Gundemarus
 Guntín to Guntini, genitive of Guntinus
 Guitiriz to Uitterici, genitive of Uittericus
 Lalín to Lallini, genitive of Lallinus
 Mondariz to Munderici, genitive of Mundericus
 Rairiz de Veiga to Ragerici, genitive of Ragericus
 Ramirás to Ranamiranis, Germanized genitive of Ranemirus 
 Sandiás to Sindilanis, Germanized genitive of Sindila
 Vilasantar to Villa Sentarii, genitive of Sentarius

Several thousand such toponyms are known in Galicia, northern Portugal, western Asturias and other territories which were part of the Suebi kingdom.

 See also 
Germanic names in Italy, similar developments

 Notes 

 Literature 

 Proto-Germanic reconstruction 
 Orel, Vladimir (2003). Handbook of Germanic Etymology. Leiden: Brill, 2003. .
 Köbler, Gerhard. (2007). Germanisches Wörterbuch. On-line .
 Kroonen, Guus. (2013). Etymological Dictionary of Proto-Germanic. Leiden: Brill, 2013. .

 Germanic personal names 
 Förstemanm, Ernst (1900).  Altdeutsches Namenbuch . P. Hanstein: Bonn, 1900.
 Fossner, Thorvald  (1916). Continental-Germanic personal names in England in Old and Middle English times. Uppsala, 1916.
 Redin, Mats (1919). Studies on uncompounded personal names  in old English. Uppsala, 1919.
 Schönfeld, M. (1911). Wörterbuch der Altgermanischen Personen und Völkernamen. Heidelberg, 1911.
 Searle, W. G. (1897). Onomasticon Anglo-Saxonicum. Cambridge: 1897.

 Galician Medieval onomastics 
 Rivas Quintas, Elixio (1991) Onomástica persoal do noroeste hispano. Alvarellos: Lugo, 1991. .
 Boullón Agrelo, Ana I. (1999). Antroponimia medieval galega (ss. VIII-XII). Tübingen: Niemeyer, 1999. .
 "Extramundi". In: Moralejo, Juan J. Callaica Nomina: Estudios de Onomástica Gallega. Fundación Pedro Barrié de la Maza, D.L. 2007. pp. 19–23.

 Germanic toponymy in Galicia and Portugal 
 Sachs, Georg (1932) Die germanischen Ortsnamen in Spanien und Portugal. Jena: Leipzig, 1932.
 Piel, J. (1933-1940) Os nomes germânicos na toponímia portuguesa''. In Boletim Português de Filologia vol. II-VII: Lisboa.
 Joseph Piel

Germanic given names